Organic synthesis is a special branch of chemical synthesis and is concerned with the intentional construction of organic compounds.  Organic molecules are often more complex than inorganic compounds, and their synthesis has developed into one of the most important branches of organic chemistry.  There are several main areas of research within the general area of organic synthesis: total synthesis, semisynthesis, and methodology.

Total synthesis 

A total synthesis is the complete chemical synthesis of complex organic molecules from simple, commercially available petrochemical or natural precursors. Total synthesis may be accomplished either via a linear or convergent approach. In a linear synthesis—often adequate for simple structures—several steps are performed one after another until the molecule is complete; the chemical compounds made in each step are called synthetic intermediates.  Most often, each step in a synthesis refers to a separate reaction taking place to modify the starting compound. For more complex molecules, a convergent synthetic approach may be preferable, one that involves individual preparation of several "pieces" (key intermediates), which are then combined to form the desired product. Convergent synthesis has the advantage of generating higher yield, compared to linear synthesis.

Robert Burns Woodward, who received the 1965 Nobel Prize for Chemistry for several total syntheses (e.g., his 1954 synthesis of strychnine), is regarded as the father of modern organic synthesis.  Some latter-day examples include Wender's, Holton's, Nicolaou's, and Danishefsky's total syntheses of the anti-cancer therapeutic, paclitaxel (trade name, Taxol).

Methodology and applications

Each step of a synthesis involves a chemical reaction, and reagents and conditions for each of these reactions must be designed to give an adequate yield of pure product, with as few steps as possible. A method may already exist in the literature for making one of the early synthetic intermediates, and this method will usually be used rather than an effort to "reinvent the wheel".  However, most intermediates are compounds that have never been made before, and these will normally be made using general methods developed by methodology researchers. To be useful, these methods need to give high yields, and to be reliable for a broad range of substrates.  For practical applications, additional hurdles include industrial standards of safety and purity.

Methodology research usually involves three main stages: discovery, optimisation, and studies of scope and limitations.  The discovery requires extensive knowledge of and experience with chemical reactivities of appropriate reagents. Optimisation is a process in which one or two starting compounds are tested in the reaction under a wide variety of conditions of temperature, solvent, reaction time, etc., until the optimal conditions for product yield and purity are found. Finally, the researcher tries to extend the method to a broad range of different starting materials, to find the scope and limitations. Total syntheses (see above) are sometimes used to showcase the new methodology and demonstrate its value in a real-world application. Such applications involve major industries focused especially on polymers (and plastics) and pharmaceuticals. Some syntheses are feasible on a research or academic level, but not for industry level production. This may lead to further modification of the process.

Stereoselective synthesis 

Most complex natural products are chiral, and the bioactivity of chiral molecules varies with the enantiomer. Historically, total syntheses targeted racemic mixtures, mixtures of both possible enantiomers, after which the racemic mixture might then be separated via chiral resolution.

In the later half of the twentieth century, chemists began to develop methods of stereoselective catalysis and kinetic resolution whereby reactions could be directed to produce only one enantiomer rather than a racemic mixture. Early examples include stereoselective hydrogenations (e.g., as reported by William Knowles and Ryōji Noyori, and functional group modifications such as the asymmetric epoxidation of Barry Sharpless; for these specific  achievements, these workers were awarded the Nobel Prize in Chemistry in 2001. Such reactions gave chemists a much wider choice of enantiomerically pure molecules to start from, where previously only natural starting materials could be used. Using techniques pioneered by Robert B. Woodward and new developments in synthetic methodology, chemists became more able to take simple molecules through to more complex molecules without unwanted racemisation, by understanding stereocontrol, allowing final target molecules to be synthesised as pure enantiomers (i.e., without need for resolution).  Such techniques are referred to as stereoselective synthesis.

Synthesis design 
Elias James Corey brought a more formal approach to synthesis design, based on retrosynthetic analysis, for which he won the Nobel Prize for Chemistry in 1990.  In this approach, the synthesis is planned backwards from the product, using standard rules.  The steps "breaking down" the parent structure into achievable component parts are shown in a graphical scheme that uses retrosynthetic arrows (drawn as ⇒, which in effect, mean "is made from").

More recently, and less widely accepted, computer programs have been written for designing a synthesis based on sequences of generic "half-reactions".

See also 
 Organic Syntheses (journal)
 Methods in Organic Synthesis (journal)
 Electrosynthesis
Automated Synthesis

References

Further reading

External links

 The Organic Synthesis Archive
 Chemical synthesis database
 https://web.archive.org/web/20070927231356/http://www.webreactions.net/search.html
 https://www.organic-chemistry.org/synthesis/
 Prof. Hans Reich's collection of natural product syntheses
 Chemical synthesis semantic wiki